The following is a timeline of the history of Jersey City, New Jersey, United States.

Prior to 19th century

19th century

 1802 - Population of Paulus Hook: 13.
 1804
 Land bought from Cornelius Van Vorst by the Associates of the Jersey Company.
 Streets of the Hook laid out.
 1812 - Steam ferry begins operating.
 1820 - "City of Jersey" incorporated in Bergen Township.
 1824 - Jersey Glass Company established.
 1825 - Jersey Porcelain and Earthenware Company incorporated.
 1833 - American Pottery Manufacturing Company in business.
 1834
 New Jersey Railroad terminal and Paterson and Hudson River Railroad terminal established.
 Newark-Jersey City horsecar begins operating.
 1835 - Jersey City Gazette newspaper begins publication.
 1836 - Morris Canal in operation.
 1838 - City renamed "Jersey City."
 1840 - City becomes part of Hudson County.
 1847
 Jersey City Telegraph newspaper begins publication.
 Dixon Mills and Colgate & Company soap factory built.
 1850 - Population: 6,856.
 1851 - Van Vorst Township becomes part of city.
 1853 - Grace Church Van Vorst built.
 1856 - Taylor's Hotel in business.
 1860 - Population: 29,227.
 1862 - Breusing florists in business.
 1867
 Lincoln Association founded.
 Evening Journal newspaper begins publication.
 1868
 Hudson County Volksblatt German-language newspaper begins publication (approximate date).
 Hudson City Savings Bank established.
 1869 - Bruckner's Variety Store in business.

1870s-1890s
 1870
 Hudson City and Bergen City become part of Jersey City.
 St. John's Episcopal Church built.
 Population: 82,546.
 Lorillard Tobacco Company relocates to Jersey City.
 1872 - Law Library Association founded.
 1872- Saint Peter's College founded
 1873 - Greenville becomes part of Jersey City.
 1874
 Abattoir and stockyards in operation.
 Jersey City Drug and Spice Mills in business.
 1876
 Aesthetic Society formed.
 Centennial of American independence.
 1887 - Pavonia Terminal opens.
 1889
 Free Public Library established.
 Central Railroad of New Jersey Terminal built.
 1890 - Population: 163,003.
 1893
 Svoboda Ukrainian-language newspaper begins publication.
 Hasbrouck Institute opens.
 1900
 Great Atlantic and Pacific Tea Company Warehouse built.
 Population: 206,433.

20th century

 1901
 Little Russian Greek Catholic Church of St. Peter and Paul built.
 American Type Founders headquartered in city.
 1904 - People's Palace established.
 1905 - West Side Park opens.
 1906 - Colgate Clock installed.
 1907 - Block Drug Company established.
 1908 - Głos Narodu Polish-language newspaper in publication (approximate date).
 1909 - Hudson Tubes begin operating to Manhattan.
 1910 - Population: 267,779.
 1912 - Lincoln High School established.
 1922 - Hudson Jewish News begins publication.
 1925
 Journal Square laid out.
 Mary Teresa Norton becomes U.S. representative for New Jersey's 12th congressional district.
 1927 - Holland Tunnel opens to Lower Manhattan.
 1929 - New Jersey State Normal School at Jersey City and Loew's Jersey Theatre opens.
 1930 - Population: 316,715.
 1937 - Jersey City Giants baseball team formed.
 1951 - Carpathian Star newspaper begins publication.
 1974 - Hudson County Community College established.
 1980
 Novyĭ Amerikanets Russian-language newspaper begins publication.
 Population: 223,532.
 1986 - Manila Times East newspaper begins publication.
 1988 - Sister city relationship established with Cusco, Peru.
 1990 - Population: 228,537.
 1991 - Govinda Sanskar Kendra Center active (approximate date).
 1993 - Liberty Science Center opens. 
 1994 - Sister city relationships established with Ahmedabad, India and Nantong, China.
 1995 - Sister city relationship established with Ozamiz, Philippines.
 1997
 Shiva Mandir shrine opens.
 Bret Schundler becomes mayor.
 October: E-ZPass activated for the Holland Tunnel Boyle Plaza.
 Sister city relationships established with Jerusalem, Israel and Vitória, Brazil.
 1998
 Parts of Ellis Island deemed part of Jersey City per New Jersey v. New York .
 City website online.
 Sister city relationship established with Oviedo, Spain.
 1999
 Jersey City Landmarks Conservancy established.
 Sister city relationship established with Sant'Arsenio, Italy.
 2000 - Population: 240,055.

21st century

 2001
 Jersey City Museum opens.
 Sister city relationship established with Kolkata, India.
 2002 - Sister city relationship established with Saint John's, Antigua.
 2004
 November: Jerramiah T. Healy elected mayor.
 Sister city relationship established with San Martín del Rey Aurelio, Spain.
 2005 - New Jersey Arya Samaj Mandir Humanitarian Mission headquartered in city.
 2008 - Sister city relationship established with Rosario, Argentina.
 2010 - Population: 247,597.
 2011 - Golden Door Film Festival begins.
 2013 - Steven Fulop becomes mayor.

See also
 Jersey City history
 Bergen Township, New Jersey (1661–1862)
 Timeline of Jersey City, New Jersey-area railroads
 National Register of Historic Places listings in Hudson County, New Jersey
 List of mayors of Jersey City

References

Bibliography

Published in the 19th century
 
 
 
 
 
 
 
 
 
 
 
 
 
 

Published in the 20th century
 
 
 
 
 
 
 
 

Published in the 21st century
  + Chronology

External links

 Images related to Jersey City, various dates (via New York Public Library)
 Items related to Jersey City, N.J., various dates (via Library of Congress, Prints & Photos division)

 
jersey city
jersey city